The Autobiography of Nicolae Ceaușescu is a 2010 Romanian documentary film directed by Andrei Ujică.

Summary 
The three-hour-long documentary covers 25 years in the life of Nicolae Ceaușescu and was made using 1,000 hours of original footage from the National Archives of Romania.

Awards
The Autobiography of Nicolae Ceaușescu was awarded the Great Prize of the documentary section of the Bergen International Film Festival.
In 2010, The Autobiography of Nicolae Ceaușescu won the Best East European Documentary Award at the 14th edition of the International Documentary Film Festival in Jihlava, the Czech Republic.

See also 
2010 in film
List of Romanian films

References

External links
Vocea Basarabiei, Autobiografia lui Nicolae Ceauşescu

The Seventh Art

2010 films
2010 documentary films
Autobiographical documentary films
Biographical films about presidents
Collage film
Documentary films about politicians
Films about communism
Films about dictators
Films about totalitarianism
Nicolae Ceaușescu
Romanian biographical films
Romanian documentary films
2010s Romanian-language films